Katsuura may refer to:

Katsuura, Chiba, a city in Chiba Prefecture
Katsuura, Tokushima, a town in Tokushima Prefecture